Northlands may refer to:

Northlands (organization), a non-profit organization in Edmonton, Alberta, Canada that operated venues in the Edmonton Northlands:
Northlands Agricom
Northlands Coliseum
Northlands Park
Northlands College, La Ronge, Saskatchewan, Canada
Northlands Denesuline First Nation, Manitoba, Canada
Northlands Girls' High School, Durban North, South Africa
Northlands Boys' High School, a former school in Durban North, South Africa
Northlands Park, Basildon, a park in Essex, England
Northlands Park, Ontario, an unincorporated railway point in northeastern Ontario, Canada
Northlands Road the site and alternative name for the County Ground, Southampton, a sports venue in England
Northlands School, Argentina
Northlands Shopping Centre, Christchurch, New Zealand
Nordlandshest/Lyngshest or Northlands pony, a Norwegian horse breed

See also 
 Northland (disambiguation)